Jonesboro is a town in, and the parish seat of, Jackson Parish in the northern portion of the U.S. state of Louisiana. The population was 4,106 in 2020.

History
Founded on January 10, 1860, by Joseph Jones and his wife, Sarah Pankey Jones, as a small family farm, Jonesboro is now a small industrial mill town. Originally founded as "Macedonia," the small town's name changed to Jonesboro on January 16, 1901, after the United States Post Office Department approved the change and became the seat of government for Jackson Parish on March 15, 1911, following a parish-wide referendum. Jonesboro remains the parish's agricultural, industrial, economic, and governmental center.

A destructive F3 tornado struck the town and nearby Hodge on September 12, 1961. Spawned by Hurricane Carla, the tornado damaged or destroyed many structures and killed five people.

During the Civil Rights Movement of the 1960s, whites violently resisted African-American efforts to gain their constitutional rights as citizens, even after the passage of the Civil Rights Act of 1964. The Ku Klux Klan, which was active in the area, conducted what was called a "reign of terror" in 1964, including harassment of activists, "the burning of crosses on the lawns of African-American voters," murder, and destroying five black churches by fire, as well as their Masonic hall, and a Baptist center.

In November 1964, Earnest "Chilly Willy" Thomas and Frederick Douglass Kirkpatrick (the latter ordained that year as a minister of the Church of God in Christ), founded the Deacons for Defense and Justice in Jonesboro. It was an armed self-defense group, largely made up of men who were World War II and the Korean War veterans. At night, they conducted regular patrols of the city's black community which occupied an area known as "the Quarters". They protected civil rights activists and their families during and outside demonstrations. At the request of activists in Bogalusa, Louisiana, another mill town where blacks were under pressure by violent whites, Thomas and Kirkpatrick helped found an affiliated chapter in that city. Ultimately there were 21 chapters in Louisiana, Mississippi, and Alabama, operating through 1968. In Jonesboro, the Deacons achieved some changes, such as integrating parks and a swimming pool. Activists achieved more after congressional passage of the Voting Rights Act of 1965 and their entry into politics.

Geography
Jonesboro is in southwestern Jackson Parish. U.S. Route 167 passes through the town's northern and eastern sides, leading north  to Ruston and south  to Winnfield. Louisiana Highway 4 passes through the center of Jonesboro, leading east  to Chatham and west  to Lucky.

Jonesboro water bodies drain north to the Little Dugdemona River, which turns southwest and forms the south-flowing Dugdemona River.

Climate 
The climate in this area is characterized by hot, humid summers and generally mild to cool winters. According to the Köppen Climate Classification system, Jonesboro has a humid subtropical climate, abbreviated "Cfa" on climate maps.

Demographics

As of the 2020 United States census, there were 4,106 people, 1,374 households, and 754 families residing in the town.

Government
The city has a mayor-council form of government; all persons are elected. Democrat James E. Bradford was inaugurated on December 29, 2014.

The previous mayor, Leslie Cornell Thompson, was suspended from office in September 2013 after being convicted of malfeasance in office. As of 2013, Jonesboro had not had a budget since 2008. His wife, Yoshi Chambers Thompson, was initially appointed by the city council to succeed him as interim mayor. Her legitimacy was questioned by Kenneth David Folden, the fiscal administrator appointed by the state the day after Thompson's conviction to bring city finances back into order. Tammy Sheridan Lee, the Monroe city judge who administered the oath to Yoshi Thompson, has withdrawn the authorization. Louisiana Attorney General Buddy Caldwell is reviewing the legality of the situation.

Meanwhile, Judge James Cecil "Jimmy" Teat of the Louisiana 2nd Judicial District Court in Jonesboro ruled that Thompson had violated the conditions of his bond through continued interference in municipal business. Judge Teat ordered Thompson to be incarcerated in the Jackson Parish Correctional Center until his sentencing on the malfeasance charges.

A Democrat, Thompson had been elected mayor on October 2, 2010, with 82votes 4 (57.6 percent) to the Republican candidate, Freddie Brown's, 607 (42.4 percent).

On October 17, 2013, based on the conviction of malfeasance, Judge Teat sentenced Mayor Thompson to six years of hard labor, large fines, $51,000 in restitution to the city of Jonesboro, five years' suspended sentence, and five years of supervised probation. Thompson will remain incarcerated pending appeal.

In the runoff election for mayor held on December 8, 2018, Thompson unseated Bradford.

Arts and culture
Jonesboro is the home of "Christmas Wonderland in the Pines", a local festival held annually. It begins the  Saturday after Thanksgiving Day and continues through December.

Jonesboro also has a "Sunshine Festival" in the summer, featuring antique cars and tractors, food, and games.

Infrastructure

Transportation
U.S. Highway 167 passes by Jackson, which is located twenty-four miles south of Ruston. SR 4 joins Highway 167 at Jonesboro, which is in the southwestern portion of Jackson Parish.

Education
The Jackson Parish School Board oversees the public school system within Jonesboro from a parish-level.

Zoned schools include:
 Jonesboro-Hodge Elementary School 
 Jonesboro-Hodge Middle School 
 Jonesboro-Hodge High School

The town is also home to the Louisiana Delta Community College Jonesboro campus, which offers courses in welding, business administration, and various general requirement courses.

Notable people

 Rodney Alexander, Republican former U.S. Representative and secretary of the Louisiana Department of Veterans Affairs in Baton Rouge
 Marty Booker, NFL wide receiver
 Marvin T. Culpepper, member of the Louisiana House of Representatives from Jackson Parish from 1964 to 1968
 James Houston "Jimmie" Davis, who is buried here, was a Louisiana governor, actors in the 1940s and 1950s, and writer of the song "You Are My Sunshine".
 John Garlington, American football linebacker in the National Football League, played with the Cleveland Browns
 Frederick Douglass Kirkpatrick, singer-songwriter, ordained minister, civil rights activist and co-founder of Deacons for Defense and Justice here in November 1964; he recorded three albums for Smithsonian Folkway Recordings (1968-1978)
 Randy Moffett, president of the University of Louisiana System from 2008 to 2012, was born in Jonesboro in 1947.
 James P. Pope, former U.S. Senator from Idaho and former mayor of Boise.
 Jerry Robinson, NFL kick returner, born in Jonesboro, played professional football for the San Diego Chargers/NYJets, 1962-1965

References

External links
Town of Jonesboro official website

Further reading
Adam Fairclough, Race and Democracy: The Civil Rights Struggle in Louisiana, 1915-1972, University of Georgia Press: 1995/reprint 1999 

Towns in Jackson Parish, Louisiana
Towns in Louisiana
Parish seats in Louisiana
Towns in Ruston, Louisiana micropolitan area